{{Infobox writer 
| name = Violet Hunt
| image = Isabel Violet Hunt.jpg
| caption = Hunt
| birth_date = 
| birth_name = Isobel Violet Hunt
| birth_place = Durham, England
| death_date = 
| death_place = Campden Hill, London, England
| occupation = Novelist, short story writer
| notableworks = </ref> She wrote feminist novels. She founded the Women Writers' Suffrage League in 1908 and participated in the founding of International PEN.

Biography
Hunt was born in Durham. Her father was the artist Alfred William Hunt, her mother the novelist and translator Margaret Raine Hunt. The family moved to London in 1865 and she was brought up in the Pre-Raphaelite group, knowing John Ruskin and William Morris. There is a story that Oscar Wilde, a friend and correspondent, proposed to her in Dublin in 1879; the significance of this event requires her to have been old enough to get engaged at that time, leading us to her correct birth date of 1862 (not 1866 as often given).

Hunt's writings ranged over a number of literary forms, including short stories, novels, memoir, and biography. She was an active feminist, and her novels The Maiden's Progress and A Hard Woman were works of the New Woman genre, while her short story collection Tales of the Uneasy is an example of supernatural fiction. Her novel White Rose of Weary Leaf is regarded as her best work, while her biography of Elizabeth Siddal is considered unreliable, with animus against Siddal's husband, Dante Gabriel Rossetti. She was also active in writers' organisations, founding the Women Writers' Suffrage League in 1908 and participated in the founding of International PEN in 1921.

Despite her considerable literary output, Hunt's reputation rests more with the literary salons she held at her home, South Lodge, in Campden Hill. Among her guests were Rebecca West, Ezra Pound, Joseph Conrad, Wyndham Lewis, D. H. Lawrence, and Henry James. She helped Ford Madox Hueffer (later known as Ford Madox Ford) establish The English Review in 1908. Many of these people were subsequently characterised in her novels, most notably Their Lives and Their Hearts.

Though never married, Hunt carried on a number of relationships, mostly with older men. Among her lovers were Somerset Maugham and H. G. Wells, though her most notable affair was with the married Hueffer, who lived with her from about 1910 to 1918 at her home South Lodge (a period including his eight-day 1911 imprisonment when he refused to pay his wife funds for the support of their two daughters). She was fictionalised by him in two novels: as the scheming Florence Dowell in The Good Soldier and as the promiscuous Sylvia Tietjens in his tetralogy Parade's End. She was also the inspiration for the character Rose Waterfield in Somerset Maugham's novel The Moon and Sixpence and Norah Nesbit in Of Human Bondage. She is also the basis for Claire Temple, the central character of Norah Hoult's There Were No Windows (1944).

Hunt also wrote two collections of supernatural stories, Tales of the Uneasy and More Tales of the Uneasy. Tales of the Uneasy was described by E. F. Bleiler as containing "Excellent stories, in which the supernatural is used as a technical device to indicate ironies of fate and the intimate relationship of life and death." Tales of the Uneasy was also included by horror historian R. S. Hadji on his list of "unjustly neglected" horror books. 
 
Violet Hunt died of pneumonia in her home in 1942. Her grave and those of her parents is at Brookwood Cemetery.

Works
The Maiden's Progress (1894)
A Hard Woman, a Story in Scenes (1895)
The Way of Marriage (1896)
Unkist, Unkind! (1897)
The Human Interest – A Study in Incompatibilities (1899)
Affairs of the Heart (1900) stories
The Celebrity at Home (1904)
Sooner Or Later (1904)
The Cat (1905)
The Workaday Woman (1906)
White Rose Of Weary Leaf (1908)
The Wife of Altamont (1910)
The Life Story of a Cat (1910)
Tales of the Uneasy (1911) stories
The Doll (1911)
The Governess (1912) with Margaret Raine Hunt
The Celebrity's Daughter (1913)
The Desirable Alien (1913) (with Ford Madox Hueffer)
The House of Many Mirrors (1915)
Zeppelin Nights: A London Entertainment (1916) with Ford Madox Hueffer
Their Lives (1916)
The Last Ditch (1918)
Their Hearts (1921)
Tiger Skin (1924) stories
More Tales of The Uneasy (1925) stories
The Flurried Years (1926) autobiography, (U.S., I Have This To Say)
The Wife of Rossetti – Her Life and Death (1932)
Return of the Good Soldier: Ford Madox Ford and Violet Hunt's 1917 Diary (1983) (with Ford Madox Ford)

Further reading

References

External links
 
 
 

British women short story writers
British women novelists
1862 births
1942 deaths
English horror writers
People educated at Notting Hill & Ealing High School
People from Durham, England
Writers from London
19th-century British novelists
19th-century British women writers
19th-century British writers
20th-century British novelists
20th-century British women writers
Women horror writers
19th-century British short story writers
20th-century British short story writers
Burials at Brookwood Cemetery
Members of the Fabian Society
British socialist feminists
British salon-holders